Raïsa Schoon (born 3 October 2001) is a Dutch beach volleyball player. She competed in the 2020 Summer Olympics. Schoon shares the same birthday with her partner Katja Stam.

References

External links
 
 
 
 
 

2001 births
Living people
People from Werkendam
Beach volleyball players at the 2020 Summer Olympics
Dutch beach volleyball players
Olympic beach volleyball players of the Netherlands
Beach volleyball players at the 2018 Summer Youth Olympics
Sportspeople from North Brabant